An annular solar eclipse occurred on October 22, 1911. A solar eclipse occurs when the Moon passes between Earth and the Sun, thereby totally or partly obscuring the image of the Sun for a viewer on Earth. An annular solar eclipse occurs when the Moon's apparent diameter is smaller than the Sun's, blocking most of the Sun's light and causing the Sun to look like an annulus (ring). An annular eclipse appears as a partial eclipse over a region of the Earth thousands of kilometres wide. Annularity was visible from the Russian Empire (the parts now belonging to Kazakhstan,  Uzbekistan and Kyrgyzstan), China, French Indochina (the part now belonging to Vietnam), Philippines, Dutch East Indies (today's Indonesia), Territory of Papua (now belonging to Papua New Guinea) including the capital city Port Moresby, and British Western Pacific Territories (the parts now belonging to Solomon Islands and Tuvalu, including the city of Honiara and Tulagi).

Related eclipses

Solar eclipses of 1910–1913

Saros 132

Notes

References

1911 10 22
1911 in science
1911 10 22
October 1911 events